Arnaldo Castillo is a Honduran politician. He serves as Honduras's Minister of Economic Development. He specializes in the fields of manufacturing, risk management, strategic planning, and trade policies. Despite his skills in economics, he graduated an electrician from the Republic of China Air Force Academy.

References

Living people
Government ministers of Honduras
Year of birth missing (living people)
Place of birth missing (living people)